Judge Adams may refer to:

Annette Abbott Adams (1877–1956), judge of the California Court of Appeal
Arlin Adams (1921–2015), judge of the United States Court of Appeals for the Third Circuit
Elmer B. Adams (1842–1916), judge of the United States Court of Appeals for the Eighth Circuit
George Adams (judge) (1784–1844), judge of the United States District Courts for the District of Mississippi and for the Northern and Southern Districts of Mississippi
George B. Adams (1845–1911), judge of the United States District Court for the Southern District of New York
Henry Lee Adams Jr. (born 1945), judge of the United States District Court for the Middle District of Florida
Jed C. Adams (1876–1935), judge of the United States Board of Tax Appeals
John R. Adams (born 1955), judge of the United States District Court for the Northern District of Ohio
Robert Patten Adams (1831–1911), puisne judge in Tasmania

See also
Justice Adams (disambiguation)